Eduardo Aguirre may refer to:

 Eduardo Aguirre (diplomat) (born 1946), United States Ambassador to Spain and Andorra from 2005 to 2009

 Eduardo Aguirre (footballer) (born 1998), Mexican footballer for Liga MX club Santos Laguna

 Eduardo Estrella Aguirre (1941–1996), Ecuadorian physician and researcher